Allen Turner Davidson (May 9, 1819 – January 24, 1905) was a prominent Confederate politician. He was born in Haywood County, North Carolina and represented the state in the Provisional Confederate Congress and the First Confederate Congress.

External links
 http://politicalgraveyard.com/bio/davidson.html
 

Members of the Confederate House of Representatives from North Carolina
1819 births
1905 deaths
People from Haywood County, North Carolina
Deputies and delegates to the Provisional Congress of the Confederate States